Leo Dautzenberg (born 4 February 1950 in Gillrath, North Rhine-Westphalia) is a German politician and member of Christian Democratic Union of Germany in the Bundestag from 1998 till 2011.

References

External links
 Bundestag biography 

1950 births
Living people
Members of the Bundestag for North Rhine-Westphalia
Members of the Bundestag 2009–2013
Members of the Bundestag 2005–2009
Members of the Bundestag 2002–2005
Members of the Bundestag 1998–2002
Members of the Bundestag for the Christian Democratic Union of Germany